Willie "Satellite" Totten (born July 4, 1962) is an American football coach and former player. He is the assistant head coach and quarterbacks coach at Mississippi Valley State University, a position he had held since 2019. Totten played college football at Mississippi Valley State and was as the starting quarterback at Delta Devils. Teamed with wide receiver Jerry Rice, Totten set more than 50 NCAA Division I-AA passing records while Rice setting many receiving records. The Delta Devils averaged 59 points a game during the 1984 season, with Totten throwing for a record 58 touchdowns and leading the Delta Devils to the NCAA Division I-AA playoffs. Archie Cooley, who was the head coach at MVSU from 1980 to 1986, was the architect of the pass-oriented offense that utilized the skills of Totten. Totten served as the head football coach at Mississippi Valley State from 2002 to 2009.

Early life and college career
Totten played his high school football at J. Z. George High School in North Carrollton, Mississippi.

Professional playing career
Totten played professionally in the Canadian Football League (CFL) with the BC Lions and Toronto Argonauts before moving on to the National Football League (NFL), as a replacement player for the Buffalo Bills during the strike-shortened 1987 NFL season. Totten played in two games, starting one. He completed 13 of 33 passes for 155 yards, two touchdowns and two interceptions during his stint in the NFL.

Totten played in the Arena Football League (AFL) for the Chicago Bruisers, Pittsburgh Gladiators, and the New Orleans Night each for a single season. During his season with Chicago, the Bruisers reached Arena Bowl II, but were defeated by the Detroit Drive. His best season came  next year in 1989 with the Gladiators when he passed for 13 touchdowns and six interceptions over the short four game season. He finished his arena football career with 1665 passing yards, 23 passing touchdowns, 13 interceptions, and 3 additional rushing touchdowns.

Coaching career
Totten earned his master's degree at Grambling State University, and was a graduate assistant on the coaching staff for head football coach Eddie Robinson. Totten returned to  his alma mater and served as quarterbacks coach and running back coach during the 1990s before moving on to coach at the high school level for two years. He returned to the MVSU coaching staff in 2000, and was elevated to head coach in 2001. Totten brought pride back to Mississippi Valley State, as he led the Delta Devils to back-to-back winning seasons in 2005 and 2006.  Totten resigned after the 2009 season, and took an administrative position at MVSU in 2010.  In 2013, Totten became quarterbacks coach at Albany State University in Albany, Georgia for one season before accepting the quarterback coaching position at Alabama A&M University under new head football coach James Spady.
In 2019 Totten returned to MVSU as an assistant head coach and quarterbacks coach.

Honors and memberships
Totten is one of a few college football coaches ever to coach in a stadium named after him. The Delta Devils football team plays in Rice–Totten Stadium, named for Totten and wide receiver Jerry Rice. He is a member of the College Football Hall of Fame. Totten is a member of Phi Beta Sigma fraternity.

Head coaching record

College

References

External links
 Mississippi Valley State profile
 

1962 births
Living people
American football quarterbacks
Alabama A&M Bulldogs football coaches
Albany State Golden Rams football coaches
BC Lions players
Buffalo Bills players
Canadian football quarterbacks
Chicago Bruisers players
Mississippi Valley State Delta Devils football players
Mississippi Valley State Delta Devils football coaches
National Football League replacement players
New Orleans Night players
Pittsburgh Gladiators players
Toronto Argonauts players
High school football coaches in Mississippi
College Football Hall of Fame inductees
Grambling State University alumni
People from Leflore County, Mississippi
Coaches of American football from Mississippi
Players of American football from Mississippi
African-American coaches of American football
African-American players of American football
African-American players of Canadian football
21st-century African-American sportspeople
20th-century African-American sportspeople